The Albert Einstein Peace Prize was a peace prize awarded annually since 1980 by the Albert Einstein Peace Prize Foundation. The Foundation dates from 1979, the centenary of the birth of Albert Einstein, and evokes the Russell–Einstein Manifesto which urges nuclear disarmament. It was established, with the sponsorship of the trustees of Einstein's estate, by William M. Swartz (1912–87) a wealthy businessman and the grandfather of activist Aaron Swartz. William M. Swartz was involved in the Pugwash Conferences on Science and World Affairs and established the Foundation in part to support Pugwash. Prize winners, mainly active in nuclear disarmament, receive(d) $50,000.

References

Peace awards
Albert Einstein
Awards established in 1980
Nuclear weapons policy